John Evens Wright Sinclair (21 July 1943 – 1 September 2010) was a Scottish footballer who played as a winger for six different clubs in the English and Scottish leagues. Sinclair played in one international game for Scotland, in 1966.

Family
Several members of his family were involved in high-level football. His uncle Tommy Wright was a Scottish international. His brother Willie Sinclair, his son Chris Sinclair and his cousin Tommy Wright were also professional footballers.

Playing career

Club career
He began his career at Dunfermline Athletic in his native Scotland, and moved south of the border to join Leicester City in May 1965.

In January 1968, Sinclair joined Newcastle United, where he became a member of the team that won the 1969 Fairs Cup. In December 1969, he was sold to Sheffield Wednesday, where he spent three-and-a-half seasons before finishing his career back in Scotland with his former club Dunfermline, and lastly Stenhousemuir.

International career
While at Leicester, Sinclair won his solitary cap for Scotland, appearing in a 1966 friendly match against Portugal.

Death
Sinclair died in September 2010, aged 67, following a long battle with cancer. He was the first member of Newcastle's Fairs Cup winning side to die.

References

External links 
 

1943 births
2010 deaths
People from Culross
Association football wingers
Scottish footballers
Scotland international footballers
Dunfermline Athletic F.C. players
Leicester City F.C. players
Newcastle United F.C. players
Sheffield Wednesday F.C. players
Chesterfield F.C. players
Stenhousemuir F.C. players
Scottish Football League players
English Football League players
Deaths from cancer in Scotland